It's My Way (also released as My Way) is an album by American jazz trumpeter Dizzy Gillespie featuring performances of popular songs recorded in 1969 and originally released on the Solid State label.

Track listing
 "Galveston" (Jimmy Webb) - 2:38
 "This Girl's in Love with You" (Burt Bacharach, Hal David) - 4:00
 "Games People Play" (Joe South) - 2:58
 "Magic Tree" (Richard Carpenter, Gladys Bruce, Gerald Ginsberg) - 3:06
 "Whatever Possess'd Me" (Tadd Dameron, Bernie Hanighen) - 3:47
 "Aquarius/Let the Sunshine In" (James Rado, Gerome Ragni, Galt MacDermot) - 3:10
 "Bésame Mucho" (Consuelo Velázquez) - 4:03
 "I'm Gonna Sit Right Down and Write Myself a Letter" (Fred E. Ahlert, Joe Young) - 3:03
 "Exotica" (L. Gillespie) - 4:17
 "Birk's Works" (Dizzy Gillespie) - 3:27

Personnel
Dizzy Gillespie - trumpet
Jerome Richardson - baritone saxophone, flute, piccolo
Joe De Angelis, Don Corrado, Paul Ingraham - French horn
Billy Butler - electric guitar
Paul Griffin - piano
Bob Bushnell - electric bass
Joe Marshall - drums
Paul Fein - tympani
Unnamed string section arranged and conducted by Jimmy Mundy

References 

Solid State Records (jazz label) albums
Dizzy Gillespie albums
1969 albums